Kevin Howarth is a British film actor, known for his roles as Max in The Last Horror Movie, Peter in Summer Scars and Viktor in The Seasoning House.

Career
Howarth attended the Webber Douglas Academy of Dramatic Art in London, from which he graduated with distinction.

Filmography
 Cash In Hand (1998) - Ripper
 The Big Swap  (1998) - Julian
 Razor Blade Smile  (1998) - Platinum
 Last Orders (short) (2000)
 The Ghost of Greville Lodge (2000) - Billyboy
 Whacked (short) (2002) - Karl Ryan
 Don't Look Back (2003) - The Stranger
 The Last Horror Movie  (2003) - Max Parry
 The Lord of the Rings: The Return of the King (2003) - character voices
 Cold and Dark (2005) - Mortimer Shade
 Summer Scars  (2007) - Peter
 Burlesque Fairytales (2010) - Jimmy Harrison
 Two Peas  (short) (2010) - Mary's Father
 Brave (2012) - character voices
 Gallowwalkers  (2012) - Kansa
 The Seasoning House  (2012) - Viktor
 The Magnificent Eleven (2013) - Vince

Television
 The First Olympian (2004)
 If... (TV series) Series 2 Episode 3: If...Drugs Were Legal (2005) - Daniel Kandinski
 Revealed – The Captain Bligh Conspiracy (2007) - James Morrison

Video games
 Wipeout Pure (2005) - Lead Male Voice
 Spartan: Total Warrior (2005) - Tiberius
 Anno 1701 (2006) - Various character voices
 Clive Barker's Jericho (2007) - Additional character voices
 The Witcher (video game) (2007) - Temerian Soldier/Rich Youth (English version)
 Wipeout Pulse (2007) - Lead Male Voice
 Rhodan: Myth of the Illochim (2008) - Ara Mediker Eol Toregent
 Memento Mori (video game) (2008)
 Anno: Create A New World (2009) - William Riley
 Trine (2009) - Amadeus the Wizard
 Venetica (2009) - Voice (English version)
 Trine 2 (2011) - Amadeus the Wizard
 Jack Keane 2: The Fire Within (2013) - Umbati
 The Raven (video game) (2013) - David Kreutzer (English version)
 The Wolf Among Us (2013-2014) - Georgie Porgie
 Risen 3: Titan Lords (2014) - Character voice
 Elden Ring (2022) - Alexander

Awards
 2004 Won Best Actor – New York City Horror Film Festival  (The Last Horror Movie)
 2004 Won Best Actor – Buenos Aires Rojo Sangre International Film Festival  (The Last Horror Movie)
 2004 Won Best Actor – Eerie Horror Film Festival  (The Last Horror Movie)
 2007 Won Best Actor – Montevideo Fantastico Film Festival  (The Last Horror Movie)
 2007 Won Best Actor – Austin Fantastic Film Festival  (Summer Scars)
 2015 Nominated for Best Vocal Ensemble in a Video Game - "BTVA Video Game Voice Acting Award"  (The Wolf Among Us)

References

External links
 
 Seasoning House – FrightFest interview
 Interview with Kevin Howarth and Paul Hyatt 
 Fantasporto 2013: Seasoning House awards 
 "Snowdrops" – Guardian audiobook review 

Living people
Alumni of the Webber Douglas Academy of Dramatic Art
Actors from Coventry
English male film actors
English male television actors
Year of birth missing (living people)